John Yorke may refer to:

John Yorke (Master of the Mint) (c.1490-1569), English merchant and Member of Parliament for Boroughbridge
John Yorke (1633–1663), British Member of Parliament for Richmond
John Yorke (1685–1757), British Member of Parliament for Richmond
John Yorke (1728–1801), British Member of Parliament for Reigate and Higham Ferrers
John Yorke (British Army officer) (1814–1890), British general
John Yorke (Conservative politician) (1836–1912), English landowner and Conservative politician
John Yorke, 7th Earl of Hardwicke (1840–1909), British naval commander
John Yorke (producer), BBC television producer

See also
John York (disambiguation)